Rhododendron dauricum is a species of flowering plant in the heath family Ericaceae native to forests and forest margins in Eastern Siberia, Mongolia, North China and Hokkaido, Japan. The Latin specific epithet dauricum means "from Siberia" – Transbaikal is also known as Dauria.

Description

Phytochemistry
R. dauricum contains monoterpenoids daurichromenic acid (DCA) and confluentin (decarboxylated DCA) as well as rhododaurichromenic acids A and B which are structurally related to Cannabichromene.

Cultivation
R. dauricum is the basis of the PJM hybrid (Rhododendron dauricum  × Rhododendron carolinianum).

The cultivar ‘Mid-winter’, with bright pink flowers, has gained the Royal Horticultural Society’s Award of Garden Merit.

References

Bibliography 
 The Plant List
 Hirsutum.com

dauricum
Flora of China
Flora of Siberia
Flora of Mongolia
Flora of Japan